Tenma-cho is a Hiroden station (tram stop) on Hiroden Main Line, located in Kanon-machi, Nishi-ku, Hiroshima.

Routes
From Tenma-cho Station, there are two of Hiroden Streetcar routes.

 Hiroshima Station - Hiroden-miyajima-guchi Route
 Hiroden-nishi-hiroshima - Hiroshima Port Route

Connections
█ Main Line
 
Koami-cho — Tenma-cho — Kanon-machi

Around station
Peace Boulevard

History

The station opened on December 8, 1912

See also
Hiroden Streetcar Lines and Routes

References 

Tenma-cho Station
Railway stations in Japan opened in 1917